Sports Car is the second album by the British singer-songwriter Judie Tzuke, released in 1980. The album peaked at no.7 in the UK, Tzuke's only Top Ten record and highest ever chart position. It was certified Silver in 1981 by the British Phonographic Industry for sales in excess of 60,000 copies.

Initially released on vinyl album and cassette by The Rocket Record Company, Sports Car was reissued on CD in 2000 by Tzuke's own record company, Big Moon Records.

Track listing
All tracks composed by Judie Tzuke and Mike Paxman, except "Rain on the Hills" by Tzuke, Paxman and Paul Muggleton

Side one
 "Sports Car" – 5:42
 "Nightline" – 3:30
 "Chinatown" – 4:41
 "Understanding" – 3:40

Side two
"The Choices You've Made" – 4:08
 "The Rise of Heart" – 4:50
 "Living on the Coast" – 4:51
 "Molly" – 3:04
 "Rain on the Hills" – 3:30

Personnel
Band members
Judie Tzuke – vocals, producer
Mike Paxman – guitar, producer
Bob Noble – keyboards
John "Rhino" Edwards – bass
Jeff Rich – drums
Paul Muggleton – backing vocals, arrangements, producer

Production
Paul Hart – arrangements on tracks 3, 5, 7 and 8
Steve Taylor – engineer, mixing
Steve Prestage, Alan Douglas, Nick Thomas, Richard Manwaring – assistant engineers
Chalkie Davies – cover photography

Charts

References

External links
Official website

Judie Tzuke albums
1980 albums
The Rocket Record Company albums
Albums produced by Mike Paxman